Marmorofusus leptorhynchus is a species of sea snail, a marine gastropod mollusc in the family Fasciolariidae, the spindle snails, the tulip snails and their allies.

Description

Distribution
This marine species occurs in the Red Sea: Egypt, Sinai, Gulf of Aqaba, Jordan, western Saudi Arabia south to Sudan and Eritrea.

References

 Tapparone-Canefri C. (1875). Studio monografico sopra i Muricidi del mar Rosso. Annali del Museo Civico di Storia Naturale di Genova. 7: 569-640, pl. 19.

External links
 Sowerby, G. B., II. (1842-1887). Thesaurus Conchyliorum: Or monographs of genera of shells. London, privately published
 Lyons W.G. & Snyder M.A. (2019). Reassignments to the genus Marmorofusus Snyder & Lyons, 2014 (Neogastropoda: Fasciolariidae: Fusininae) of species from the Red Sea, Indian Ocean, and southwestern Australia. Zootaxa. 4714(1): 1-64

leptorhynchus
Gastropods described in 1875